Villamarzana is a comune (municipality) in the Province of Rovigo in the Italian region Veneto, located about  southwest of Venice and about  southwest of Rovigo.

The municipality of Villamarzana contains the frazioni (subdivisions, mainly villages and hamlets) Bastion, Boaria, Fondo Cuore, Gambero, Gognano, I Maggio, Preguerre, and Stongarde.

Villamarzana borders the following municipalities: Arquà Polesine, Costa di Rovigo, Frassinelle Polesine, Fratta Polesine, Pincara.

Demographic evolution

References

External links 

Cities and towns in Veneto